Pierre River or Rivière Pierre may refer to:

 Pierre River (Brébeuf Lake), a tributary of Brébeuf Lake in Le Fjord-du-Saguenay Regional County Municipality, Quebec, Canada
 Pierre River (Mitchinamecus River tributary), in the unorganized territory of Baie-Obaoca, Quebec, Canada

See also
 Rivière-à-Pierre (disambiguation)
 Jean-Pierre River
 Pierre-Paul River
 Saint Pierre River (disambiguation)